Christian Union – Reformed Political Party is a parliamentary common list for the European Parliament formed by two Dutch orthodox Protestant parties: the Christian Union and the Reformed Political Party. Both parties are eurosceptic and morally conservative, and each has candidates on the common list. The CU and SGP also regularly co-operate in municipal elections, often gaining above-average results in municipalities which form part of the Dutch Bible Belt.

History
The Reformed Political Alliance (GPV) and the Reformed Political Party (SGP) first tried to enter the European Parliament on their own in the 1979 European Parliament election. In 1984 they formed a common list together with the Reformed Political Party (RPF). The RPF-GPV-SGP parliamentary common list got its first seat in the 1984 European Parliament election.

In 2001, RPF and the GPV merged into the Christian Union. After this merger the common list was renamed to Christian Union-SGP. The 2004 European election was the first time it took part under this name.

In 2022, both parties decided to not compete as a list in future European Parliament elections.

European grouping
 1984 and 1989: The parties were not part of any group and thus part of Non-Inscrits
 1994: All parties were part of the first eurosceptic group in the European Parliament. Europe of Nations (EN), which dissolved in 1996 and succeeded by the Independents for a Europe of Nations (I-EN)
 1999: The Independents for a Europe of Nations (I-EN) reorganised and renamed to Europe of Democracies and Diversities (EDD) group. 
 2004: The RPF and GPV merged into the Christian Union. The Europe of Democracies and Diversities (EDD) group reorganised itself into a new group, the Independence/Democracy (IND/DEM) group. Both the Christian Union and the Reformed Political Party were part of the Independence/Democracy (IND/DEM) group.
 2009: In June 2009, the Independence/Democracy (IND/DEM) group broke up, because many member parties joined the European Conservatives and Reformists (ECR) group, including the Christian Union. The ECR leadership did not want the SGP to join the new European parliamentary group, because of its conservative views on women. The Independence/Democracy (IND/DEM) group reorganised and renamed itself to the Europe of Freedom and Democracy (EFD). The SGP joined this new group.
 2014: The ECR accepted the SGP after all, as the SGP had softened its position on female suffrage. Since the 2014 European elections, the Christian Union and SGP are thus again part of the same group.
 2019: The CU left the ECR arguing that the ECR was moving too far to the right by including MEPs far-right parties such as the Dutch Forum for Democracy and the Sweden Democrats. The party instead joined the European People's Party Group while SGP stayed in ECR.

European Parliament

Common list 
Results for Christian Union-SGP common list. Participated as SGP/RPF/GPV, before 2004

SGP 
Reformed Political Party (SGP)

GPV 
Reformed Political Alliance (GPV)

Current members of the European Parliament 

2 Seats:
 Peter van Dalen (CU) (top candidate)
 Bert-Jan Ruissen (SGP)

References

External links
ChristenUnie–SGP web site

Eurosceptic parties in the Netherlands
Political party alliances in the Netherlands
Protestant political parties
Confessional parties in the Netherlands
Political parties established in 1984
Political parties disestablished in 2022
1984 establishments in the Netherlands
2022 disestablishments in the Netherlands